The list of United States high-school national records in track and field is separated by indoor and outdoor and boys and girls who have set a national record in their respective events.

While these records have been compiled for over 100 years, there are varying standards for these records. The National Federation of State High School Associations (NFHS) compiles records based only upon competitions its state affiliates sanction. Those would be scholastic dual meets, high-school-only invitationals and championship meets up through the individual state championships.

Track and Field News (T&FN) has tracked records by any American high school students, in any competition until they enter college. These records include marks made in open competition against higher-level competitors, post-season meets and international competition up until August 31 following their high-school graduation.

Since there are no national championships in high-school competition, post-state-championship meets that proclaim such a position are not sanctioned by the NFHS and thus fall only under the T&FN guidelines.

Additionally, high-school competition is conducted under slightly different rules, which have evolved over time. For example, in 1980, high schools converted their running distances from Imperial (yards) to metric, but instead of running conventional international distances like 1500 metres in place of the mile run, a more equitable but non-standard 1600 meters was chosen. For the two-mile run, they run 3200 meters. For the long-hurdle race, they run 300 meters instead of the 400 metres hurdles. Some states ran over lower hurdle heights for a period of time. In field events, boys throw different weights of their implements than with international open division or the more comparable junior-division implements. Some states throw javelin or hammer, while the majority do not. Over time, this has resulted in statisticians collecting results and performing conversions as athletes have run different distances, jumped different hurdles and thrown different weights. Invitational meets have offered an assortment of legacy events and an array of relays, which allow each new generation of athlete a legitimate opportunity to compete in all these events, effectively keeping all records relevant and contemporary.

On this list, marks listed as the NFHS record with no other marks listed for that event, are the universally accepted record in the current official events.

Outdoor
Key

Boys

Girls

Indoor
Key

Boys

Girls

Notes

References
General
Track and Field News boys records – Outdoor 21 April 2022 updated
Track and Field News girls records – Outdoor 8 February 2023 updated
Track and Field News boys records – Indoor 25 March 2022 updated
Track and Field News girls records – Indoor 24 February 2023 updated
NFHS National High School record book
NFHS National High School Track and Field Records – Boys
NFHS National High School Track and Field Records – Girls 3 June 2022 updated

Specific

United States high school
track and field, high school
High school records
Track and field